Octavian Calmîc (born 9 October 1974) is a former Moldovan politician. He served as Minister of Economy and Infrastructure from 20 January 2016 to 21 December 2017.

References 

Living people
1974 births
Place of birth missing (living people)
Moldovan Ministers of Economy
21st-century Moldovan politicians